Dongbei University of Finance and Economics Press (DUFEP; ; Dongbei means Northeast) is a university press owned by Dongbei University of Finance and Economics, located in Dalian, Liaoning Province, Northeast China.

General Information
 Established: 1985
 President: Fang Hongxing
 Address: No. 217 Jianjie, Heishijiao, Dalian City, Liaoning Province

Published Books
DUFEP publishes various books. 
 Books Published by DUFEP (amazon.com)

See also 
 Dongbei University of Finance and Economics

References

External links 
 Official site

University presses of China
Publishing companies of China
Dongbei University of Finance and Economics
Companies based in Dalian
Chinese companies established in 1985
Publishing companies established in 1985